The Caulfield Guineas Prelude is a Melbourne Racing Club Group 3 Thoroughbred horse race for colts and geldings aged three years old, under set weights and penalties conditions over a distance of 1400 metres, held at Caulfield Racecourse, Melbourne, Australia in late September. Total prize money for the race is A$300,000. This event is a preparation race for the prestigious Group 1 Caulfield Guineas later in October at Caulfield.

History

Four horses have won the Caulfield Guineas Prelude and Caulfield Guineas double:

Alfa (1996)
Wonderful World (2006)
Anacheeva (2010)
Helmet (2011)

Name
1985–1989 - Show Day Stakes
1990–1997 - J D Macdonald Stakes
1998–1999 - Macdonald Stakes
2000 onwards - Caulfield Guineas Prelude

Grade
1985–2000 - Listed Race
2001 onwards - Group 3

Distance
1985–1990 – 1200 metres
1991 onwards - 1400 metres

Winners

 2022 - Aft Cabin
 2021 - Lightsaber
 2020 - Crosshaven
2019 - Alligator Blood
2018 - Native Soldier
2017 - Perast
2016 - Sacred Elixir
2015 - Bon Aurum
2014 - Rich Enuff
2013 - Eclair Big Bang
2012 - Epaulette
2011 - Helmet
2010 - Anacheeva
2009 - Demerit
2008 - Fernandina
2007 - Purrealist
2006 - Wonderful World
2005 - Apache Cat
2004 - Tirade
2003 - Elvstroem
2002 - Great Glen
2001 - Pure Theatre
2000 - Fubu 
1999 - Sudurka
1998 - Bet On A Rode 
1997 - Umrum
1996 - Alfa
1995 - Strategic
1994 - Racer's Edge 
1993 - Port Watch 
1992 - Just Juan
1991 - Laranto
1990 - Unspoken Word
1989 - Sussex Star
1988 - Kingston Heritage
1987 - Noted
1986 - Wild Rampage
1985 - Brequillo

See also
 List of Australian Group races
 Group races

References

Horse races in Australia
Flat horse races for three-year-olds
Caulfield Racecourse